Veliki Izvor is a suburb in the city of Zaječar, Serbia. According to the 2002 census, the town has a population of 2684 people.

References

Populated places in Zaječar District